Kickham or Kickhams may refer to:
Surname
 Charles Kickham (1828–82) Irish republican ideologue and writer
 John Kickham (1847–1917) member of the Legislative Assembly of Prince Edward Island, Canada
 Mike Kickham (born 1988) Major League baseball player 
 Thomas Joseph Kickham (1901–74) member of the Legislative Assembly of Prince Edward Island and the Canadian House of Commons

GAA clubs named after Charles Kickham
 Ballymun Kickhams GAA, Dublin city
 Knockavilla-Donaskeigh Kickhams GAA, Dundrum, South Tipperary
 Mullinahone-CJ Kickhams GAA, Mullinahone, South Tipperary
 Cooley Kickhams, Louth GAA
 Creggan Kickhams, Antrim GAA
 Ardoyne Kickhams, Belfast, Antrim GAA
 Wrensboro Kickhams, predecessor of Thurles Sarsfields, North Tipperary
 Riverstown Charles Kickhams, predecessor of Kildangan GAA (Tipperary)